Yeniarx, Agdash may refer to:
 Yeniarx, Aşağı Zeynəddin
 Yeniarx, Qobuüstü